Pullakuttikaran is a 1995 Indian Tamil-language drama film, written and directed by Parthiban. The film stars himself in the lead role, alongside Sangita, while Prakash Raj and Urvashi portray supporting roles along with Malayalam actor Sreenivasan acted his first Tamil film. The music for the film was composed by Deva and the film opened to mixed reviews in July 1995.

Plot
Parthiban who takes care of orphaned children in a van leads his livelihood by stealing money. Sangeetha falls in love with him after seeing his cleverness in taking money when he was pretended to portray a pick-pocket in an stage play. Sangeetha ties the sacred thread herself starts leading her life as Parthiban's wife. Parthiban feels reluctant to accept her as his wife but later relents.

Both have one thing in common with the evil minister (Chandrasekhar). Sangeetha had escaped from the forced marriage to his dimwitted brother (Prakash Raj) who does it to every women. When Parthiban pretends to help Chandrasekhar in his elections, he changed his money to the other political party and thereby making him lose votes and support. Chandrasekhar who felt cheated joined hands with the opponent political party and kills Parthiban's innocent wife (Urvashi).

In the end, Chandrasekhar searching for Parthiban and Sangeetha, Parthiban kills Chandrasekhar and escapes with his family in train with world assuming that he is no more.

Cast
 Parthiban as Veeraiyan
 Sangita as Ammu
 Urvashi as Azhagu
 Prakash Raj
 Vaagai Chandrasekhar
 Madhan Bob
 Sreenivasan
Nagesh
R. S. Sivaji

Production
Karu Pazhaniappan was introduced as an assistant director through the film.

Soundtrack
Soundtrack was composed by Deva and lyrics written by Vairamuthu.

Release
Thulasi of Kalki wrote Parthiban sends home with no tears and no blanket, with a slight sadness. A salute for making me laugh so far. Sir, why we need all the logic!. M. Prabhaharan won the Tamil Nadu State Film Award for Best Art Director for his work in the film, which also marked his debut.

References

External links

1990 films
Indian action drama films
1990s Tamil-language films
Films scored by Deva (composer)
Films directed by R. Parthiban
1990s action drama films